Vudal Gazelle FC, more commonly referred to simply as Gazelle FC, is a semi-professional association football club based in Kokopo, East New Britain, Papua New Guinea. The club was founded in 2019.

The club were late replacements into the 2019 edition of the Papua New Guinea National Soccer League, taking part in the Islands Conference. The club eventually finished 5th out of five teams.

History 
The club participation in the 2019 Papua New Guinea National Soccer League was confirmed by PNGFA president John Kapi Natto in February 2019. 

Throughout the season, the club endured transport and scheduling difficulties: their opening fixture against Greengold Liners on 2 March was postponed as the engine on their boat from Rabaul to Kimbe failed six times. On 12 March, it was reported that matches at the Ceremonial Park in Kokopo would be cancelled until further notice, due to a civil incident involving the burning of houses and vehicles. On Saturday 16 March, the club forfeited their fixture against Chebu AROB FC in Kimbe, West New Britain, with the NSL explaining that they had been unable to get in touch with the team since their departure from East New Britain on the Friday.

The club did complete the remainder of their fixtures, but only managed to secure three draws from eight games, losing five and finishing bottom of the conference.

Domestic record

National competitions 

 Papua New Guinea National Soccer League
 2019: Islands Conference: 5th

References 

Football clubs in Papua New Guinea
Association football clubs established in 2019
2019 establishments in Papua New Guinea